Jeffrey Leon Blackshear  (March 29, 1969 – August 31, 2019) was an American football guard who played nine seasons in the National Football League (NFL). He played for the Seattle Seahawks, Baltimore Ravens, Kansas City Chiefs and Green Bay Packers. Blackshear attended Northeast Louisiana University.

References

1969 births
2019 deaths
People from Fort Pierce, Florida
Players of American football from Florida
American football offensive guards
Deaths from pancreatic cancer
Northwest Mississippi Rangers football players
Louisiana–Monroe Warhawks football players
Place of death missing
Seattle Seahawks players
Baltimore Ravens players
Kansas City Chiefs players
Green Bay Packers players
Deaths from cancer in the United States